This is a list of the number-one songs of 2022 in Panama. The charts are published by Monitor Latino, based on airplay across radio stations in Panama using the Radio Tracking Data, LLC in real time, with its chart week running from Monday to Sunday.

In 2022, fifteen songs reached number one in Panama, with ten songs being collaborations; a sixteenth single, "Tacones Rojos" by Sebastián Yatra began its run at number one in November 2021. In fact, twenty-five acts topped the chart as either lead or featured artists, with thirteen—Ed Sheeran, Camilo, Rosalía, Natti Natasha, Maria Becerra, Los Legendarios, Chencho Corleone, Quevedo, Bizarrap, Emil, Ir Sais, Eix, Beéle and Maffio—achieving their first number-one single in Panama.

Karol G became the first artist in Panama to replace herself at number one as "Provenza" knocked off her collaboration with Becky G, "Mamiii". So far, Maluma, Karol G and Emil are the only acts to have more than a number-one song so far in 2022, with two each.

Chart history

References 

Panamanian music-related lists
Panama
2021 in Panama